I'm in Love may refer to:

Albums
I'm in Love (Evelyn King album) or the title song (see below), 1981 
I'm in Love (Melba Moore album) or the title song, 1988
I'm in Love (Sanna Nielsen album) or the title song (see below), 2011
I'm in Love, by Wilson Pickett, or the title song (see below), 1968

Songs
"I'm in Love" (Bobby Womack song), first recorded by Wilson Pickett, 1968; covered by Aretha Franklin, 1974
"I'm in Love" (Evelyn "Champagne" King song), 1981
"I'm in Love" (Ginuwine song), 2006
"I'm in Love" (Ola song), 2012
"I'm in Love" (Lennon–McCartney song), first recorded by the Fourmost, 1963
"I'm in Love" (Sanna Nielsen song), 2011
"I'm in Love (I Wanna Do It)", by Alex Gaudino, 2010
"I'm in Luv", by Joe, 1993
 "I'm in Love", by Audio Bullys from Generation, 2005
"I'm in Love", by Badfinger from Magic Christian Music, 1970
"I'm in Love", by Men Without Hats from The Adventures of Women & Men Without Hate in the 21st Century, 1989
"I'm in Love", by Mini Mansions from Guy Walks Into a Bar..., 2019
"I'm in Love", by Offer Nissim featuring Maya, 2008
"I'm in Love", by Ruby Turner from Women Hold Up Half the Sky, 1986
"I'm in Love", by Secret from Secret Summer, 2014
"I'm in Love", by Starparty; see Ferry Corsten discography#Singles, 1997

Other uses 
 "I'm in Love!" (RuPaul's Drag Race All Stars), a television episode

See also
In Love (disambiguation)
Estoy Enamorado (disambiguation), the phrase in Spanish